A stroller is a form of baby transport.

Stroller or strollers may also refer to:

Street children in Cape Town living a bergie lifestyle
Stroller (style), men's daytime semiformal wear
Stroller (horse), show jumping champion
Civil Service Strollers F.C., senior non-league football team from Edinburgh, Scotland
West Bromwich Strollers, former name of the West Bromwich Albion F.C.